Ebenezer Presbyterian Church is a historic African-American Presbyterian church at 720 Bern Street in New Bern, Craven County, North Carolina.  It was built in 1924, and is a small brick Late Gothic Revival-style church building.

It was listed on the National Register of Historic Places in 1997.

References

African-American history of North Carolina
Presbyterian churches in North Carolina
Churches in New Bern, North Carolina
Churches on the National Register of Historic Places in North Carolina
Churches completed in 1924
20th-century Presbyterian church buildings in the United States
National Register of Historic Places in Craven County, North Carolina